The Schools Council was from 1964 to 1984 the body which co-ordinated secondary school examinations in England and Wales, and advised the government on matters to do with such examinations. It succeeded the Secondary Schools Examinations Council and the Curriculum Study Group. Its first chair was Sir John Maud.

In 1978, Dr. Kevin Keohane was selected to set up a study group by the then Secretary of State for Education, to look into the proposals for a Certificate of Extended Education that had been proposed by the Schools Council. The resulting report became known as the Keohane Report (officially called Proposals for a Certificate of Extended Education) recommendations were rejected by the then Department for Education and Science.

In 1982 an independent review body advised the government that "the Schools Council should continue with its present functions and should not be made the subject of further external review for at least five years", and the government announced its abolition. The Schools Council ceased to exist on 31 March 1984 and it was replaced by the Secondary Examinations Council (SEC) and the School Curriculum Development Committee (SCDC).

References

History of education in England
History of education in Wales
Secondary education in England
Secondary education in Wales